Vidyashilp Academy is a private, co-educational school located in Yelahanka, Bangalore, India.

Campus 

Vidyashilp Academy is a top-ranking ICSE and Cambridge school located in Bangalore North. The school is also a member of the Association of International Schools in India.  While having its own in-house curriculum, the school also follows the ICSE board along with A Levels.

Curriculum 
The school is affiliated with The Council For The Indian School Certificate Examinations (CISCE) and the University Of Cambridge International Examinations (CIE). The school therefore draws its curriculum from these organisations.

Ranking and reputation 
In 2017, Vidyashilp Academy won 2nd place in the UNESCO ‘happy school’ video contest. That same year, the school set up an advanced learning centre for gifted children in collaboration with the National Institute of Advanced Studies, otherwise known as NIAS, and IISC, Bangalore) 

Contribution to the – Happy Schools! A framework for learner well-being in the asia pacific drafted by UNESCO Bangkok Based Happy School Project 2015.

References

Private schools in Bangalore
International schools in Bangalore
1996 establishments in Karnataka
Educational institutions established in 1996